Rocks at Whiskey Trench is a Canadian documentary film, directed by Alanis Obomsawin and released in 2000. The film centres on the Honoré Mercier Bridge blockade of 1990 during the Oka Crisis, focusing in particular on the incident when a group of Mohawk women and children from Kahnawake, in the process of being evacuated from the community due to fears of a Canadian Forces occupation, were violently pelted with rocks as they crossed into Montreal.

A National Film Board of Canada production, it was released in both English and French versions. The film received a Genie Award nomination for Best Feature Length Documentary at the 21st Genie Awards.

References

External links

Rocks at Whiskey Trench, watch on-line at NFB.ca

2000 films
Canadian documentary films
Films directed by Alanis Obomsawin
National Film Board of Canada documentaries
Women in Quebec
First Nations in Quebec
2000s Canadian films